Wildcat Comic Con was a comic book convention held in Williamsport, Pennsylvania, United States, at the Pennsylvania College of Technology. The conventions name came from the mascot of the Pennsylvania College of Technology. Wildcat Comic Con placed extra value with educators and librarians and how comic books and graphic novels can be used in the educational fields.

Programming
Wildcat Comic Con typically featured an animation film festival, artist alley, author book-signings, author luncheons, cosplay competition, exhibitors, drawing sessions, fan presentations, LAN party, masquerade ball, portfolio reviews, professional presentations, Star Wars impersonators, vendors, video game contests and demonstrations, and workshops.

History 
The convention was the first large scale Comic Con to be held in Central Pennsylvania and the first to be held by a college. The idea for the convention came from John Weaver, a high school teacher. It was primarily organized by Lisette Ormsbee (director of the Madigan Library) and John Shableski (former comics distributor), neither of which had previous experience hosting a comic convention. The convention evolved from lectures hosted with the local high school to promote Penn College's video game program. Early in the planning of the convention, discussions were held about naming the convention Millionaire Comic-Con (the high schools mascots name), and holding it at Williamsport High School. Several comic book nights "ComiXnite" were held during the fall at Penn College on Wednesday nights to build interest in the convention. In the first year the convention provided eighty hours of content. In 2014, the convention held post event programming that included game shows and gaming.

The convention received financial support from the community in 2013 including a $9,000 grant from the Lycoming County Visitors Bureau (Lycoming County Travel and Tourism Initiative) and $2,250 from the Pennsylvania Army National Guard (Heroes 4 Higher group). The Lycoming County Visitors Bureau raised its funding from $5,000 in 2012. In 2013 the convention had 38 vendors, an increase from 10 in 2012. The Lycoming County Visitors Bureau granted $10,000 to Wildcat Comic Con in 2014 for advertising.

Event history

See also
New York Comic Con
Pittsburgh Comicon

References

Defunct comics conventions
Recurring events established in 2012
2012 establishments in Pennsylvania
Annual events in Pennsylvania
Festivals in Pennsylvania
Tourist attractions in Lycoming County, Pennsylvania
Williamsport, Pennsylvania
Pennsylvania State University
Conventions in Pennsylvania